Björn Borg was the defending champion, but lost in the quarterfinals this year.

Jimmy Connors won the tournament, beating Tom Gullikson in the final, 6–1, 6–2.

Seeds

  Björn Borg (quarterfinals)
  Jimmy Connors (champion)
  Ivan Lendl (quarterfinals)
  Vitas Gerulaitis (first round)
  Eliot Teltscher (second round)
  John Sadri (semifinals)
  Roscoe Tanner (second round)
  Victor Amaya (quarterfinals)

Draw

Finals

Top half

Bottom half

References

 Main Draw

1980 Grand Prix (tennis)
Tokyo Indoor